Claire Selltiz (1914–2000) was an American social psychologist who is credited with laying out three principles of causality: correlation, precedence and nonspuriousness, in the 1959 introductory research methods textbook Research methods in social relations of which she was the lead author. Salvatore Babones notes that prior to her widely cited 1959 book "there seems to be no earlier formulation of the three principles as such", and that "the entire academic community... adopted these principles" from that book.

See also
Obliteration by incorporation

References

Further reading
Selltiz, C, Jahoda, M., Deutsch, M., and Cook, S. W. 1959. Research Methods in Social Relations, rev. ed. New York: Holt, Rinehart and Winston

20th-century American psychologists
American women psychologists
1914 births
2000 deaths
20th-century American women
20th-century American people